The 2014 Oberstaufen Cup was a professional tennis tournament played on clay courts. It was the 23rd edition of the tournament which was part of the 2014 ATP Challenger Tour. It took place in Oberstaufen, Germany between 21 and 27 July 2014.

Singles main-draw entrants

Seeds

 1 Rankings are as of July 14, 2014.

Other entrants
The following players received wildcards into the singles main draw:
  Simone Bolelli
  Philipp Petzschner
  Kevin Krawietz
  Johannes Härteis

The following players received entry from the qualifying draw:
  Gibril Diarra
  Jozef Kovalík
  Wesley Koolhof
  Andriej Kapaś

Champions

Singles

  Simone Bolelli def.  Michael Berrer 7–5, 1–6, 6–3

Doubles

  Wesley Koolhof /  Alessandro Motti def.  Radu Albot /  Mateusz Kowalczyk 7–6(9–7), 6–3

External links
Official website

Oberstaufen Cup
Oberstaufen Cup
2014 in German tennis